Chak 17/14L (Urdu,) is a village of Punjab, Pakistan.

Location 
Chak 17/14L is a village of Punjab, Pakistan in Sahiwal District, near the town of Iqbal Nagar. The village is situated on MULTAN Road. The village is approximately 8 km away from National Highway also known as Grand Trunk Road. Main crops are wheat and cotton. It has 25000 people. Literacy rate of village is almost 70 percent. Most of the people of 17/14.L are religious minded.

Climate 
The climate of Chak 17/14L is hot and misty during summer days while cold and dry in winter. Generally the summer season commences in March - April and ends before October. January in winter chills from 7 to 22 °C. The summer temperature averages 35 °C though it often shoots up to 45 °C.

Economy 
The main source of villagers income is through agriculture. The villagers used to grow various crops like wheat, cotton, rice and other such crops. Some people of the village also have fruit farms these farms have variety of fruits like mangoes, oranges and other such fruits. The village also earns by milk of animals, there are two milk collection center for collecting the milk. The two milk collection center are of Nestlé, Haleeb.Engro

References 

Populated places in Sahiwal District